Balqis Khanum (25 December 1948 – 21 December 2022) was a Pakistani classical singer. Khanum was best known for her work in "New Life: New Life" (1968) and "Mele Sajna Di" (1972).

Early life 
Bilqees was born on December 25, 1948 at Lahore, Garhi Shahu, Pakistan. Bilqees father named Abdul Haq was a furnituremaker and her mother was a housewife. She was the eldest sister among her seven siblings including five girls and two boys.

Bilqees family then moved to Faisalabad and there she attended primary school and she was interested in the urdu language which led her to develop a clear pronunciation despite her Punjabi background.

Bilqees was interested in singing from an early age and used to sing at school functions. Bilqees maternal grandfather Inayat Ali Khan noticed her potiental towards her singing so he gave her singing lessons later her family moved back to Lahore from Faisalabad and settled in the Ghalib Market and then Bilqees started performing in private concerts, where she used to sing ghazals.

Career 
In 1964 a friend of her father heard her singing and suggested to Bilqees  that she should try singing in radio after three months she went to Radio Pakistan Lahore and gave an audition and later she got a call from Radio Pakistan that she was accepted and she joined as a chorus singer.

After she gained some confidence she and forty other singers gave audition for as a lead singer and producer Saleem Gilani took her audition impressed with her voice and she was selected among the forty singers. Then she started singing from radio stations in Rawalpindi and Muzaffarabad. However, she continued to perform at private concerts as she begin to support her family financially and funding the education of her younger sisters and brothers. According to Bilqees that she was deprived of education due to her family's financial situation so she wanted her younger siblings to achieved higher education.

When television started in Lahore at that time Bilqees was already an established radio singer and didn't have to audition to get an opportunity on television. She started her singing career on Pakistan Television with a Punjabi song, and then went on to sing many national songs during the 1965 war.

Bilqees also did playback singing in forty films such as Tasvir (1966), Nai Zindagi Naya Jeevan (1968), Guddo (1970), Farz (1973) and Nawabzadi (1979). 

She visited Karachi in early 1970s for a concert and decided to settle in Karachi. Later she recorded her first big hit for television Anokha ladla; a composition of Ustad Ashiq Ali Khan in Raag Darbari it's lyrics were penned by Asad Mohammad Khan it was presented for the first time in Amir Imam's program Sargam it was an instant hit.

In 1978, she met the famous sitarist, Ustad Rais Khan, a maestro of Meewati Gharana, who was living in India at the time and was visiting Karachi for a concert. In 1980, they got married, and Bilqees Khanum moved to India with Rais. There she began to perform at concerts and on radio but in 1986 she along with her husband Ustad Rais moved back to Pakistan and again settled in Karachi.

After returning to Pakistan at Karachi, she joined PTV and began to sing many songs such as Anokha ladla, Faasle Aise Bhi Honge, Kuch Din Toh Baso Meri Aankhon Mein and Wo Toh Khushboo Hai in many programs.

In 2008 she retired and went to live with her sons at Karachi.

Personal life 
In 1980 she married classical sitarist Rais Khan and she had two children. Both of her sons Hazoor Hussnain and Farhan Raees Khan, who live in Pakistan, are also classical sitar performers and her younger brother Mohsin Raza is a classical singer.

Illness and death 
Bilqees contracted a prolong illness from which she died in Karachi on 21 December 2022. She was laid to rest in the Wadi-i-Hussain graveyard after her funeral prayers were held at Bargah Khairul Amal mosque in Federal B area.

Filmography

Film

References

External links 
 
 

1948 births
20th-century Pakistani women singers
Hum Award winners
20th-century Indian women classical singers
Musicians from Karachi
Singers from Lahore
20th-century Indian women singers
Sitar players
Hindi-language singers
21st-century Indian women singers
Urdu-language singers
Pakistani musicians
21st-century Pakistani women singers
Punjabi-language singers
Indian emigrants to Pakistan
21st-century Indian women classical singers
Pakistani women singers
2022 deaths
Hindustani instrumentalists
Radio personalities from Lahore
Urdu playback singers
Pakistani classical singers
Indian ghazal singers
Pakistani radio personalities
Pakistani ghazal singers
Women ghazal singers
Indian women ghazal singers